Saint Fothad, also known as Fothad Na Canoine ("of the canon") was an Irish monk and saint who lived in Fahan-Mura monastery in modern-day County Donegal, Ireland during the late 8th century. He moved quickly up to the rank of bard. He then became a counsellor to High King of Ireland Áed Oirdnide.

He both challenged and supported the king, using his renowned intelligence to write a remonstrance against the king's policy of drafting clergymen, and taking part in his military crusades. One such crusade, against the Leinstermen, had led to a greater veneration of Fothad amongst the Irish. He also edited the "Felire", an encyclopedia of saints compiled by another Irish saint, Saint Aengus.

References

Medieval Irish saints
People from County Tyrone
9th-century Irish poets
9th-century Christian monks